The Legend Hunters is an upcoming Chinese action film directed by Simon West and Li Yifan, from a screenplay by Li Yifan. It is based on the novel series Ghost Blows Out the Light by Zhang Muye. The film stars Zhang Hanyu, Jiang Wu and Celina Jade.

The film was set to be theatrically released in Mainland China, by Wanda Pictures and Saints Entertainment, in 2021.

Premise
The film follows a team of adventurers as they try to raid a tomb made by master tomb raiders.

Cast
 Zhang Hanyu as Hu Bayi
 Jiang Wu
 Celina Jade

Production

Development
In May 2019, Simon West signed on to direct two Chinese films, Skyfire and The Legend Hunters. The Legend Hunters is based on the popular novel series Ghost Blows Out the Light.

Filming
Principal photography began in June 2019 at the Qingdao Oriental Movie Metropolis, with Zhang Hanyu, Jiang Wu and Celina Jade in starring roles. Filming wrapped in August 2019, in Russia.

Release

Initially scheduled for a July 2020 release, The Legend Hunters was rescheduled to be released in Mainland China by Wanda Pictures and Saints Entertainment in 2021.

References

External links
 

Chinese fantasy adventure films
Chinese action films
Films directed by Simon West
Films postponed due to the COVID-19 pandemic
Films shot in China
Films shot in Russia
Ghost Blows Out the Light
Mandarin-language films
Treasure hunt films
Upcoming films